Ib Nielsen (born 4 February 1926) is a Danish rower. He competed at the 1948 Summer Olympics in London with the men's eight where they were eliminated in the round one repêchage.

References

External links
 

1926 births
Possibly living people
Danish male rowers
Olympic rowers of Denmark
Rowers at the 1948 Summer Olympics
People from Faxe Municipality
European Rowing Championships medalists
Sportspeople from Region Zealand